Eupithecia rubridorsata is a moth in the family Geometridae. It is found in India (Sikkim), Nepal, and China.

References

Moths described in 1895
rubridorsata
Moths of Asia